Magali Humbert-Faure (born 21 January 1972) is a French former cyclist. She competed in the women's 500 metres time trial at the 2000 Summer Olympics. In 2012, she coached centenarian cyclist Robert Marchand with Robert Mistler for his 100+ Masters records.

References

External links
 

1972 births
Living people
French female cyclists
Olympic cyclists of France
Cyclists at the 2000 Summer Olympics
People from Bar-le-Duc
Sportspeople from Meuse (department)
Cyclists from Grand Est
20th-century French women
21st-century French women